Acronicta dinawa is a moth of the family Noctuidae. It is found in Queensland and Papua New Guinea.

External links
Australian Faunal Directory
Image

Acronicta
Moths of Australia
Moths of New Guinea
Moths described in 1906